Cargill is a male given name. Notable people with the name include:

 Cargill Gilston Knott (1856–1922), Scottish physicist
 Cargill MacMillan Sr. (1900–1968), American businessman
 Cargill MacMillan Jr. (1927–2011), American businessman

Masculine given names